Cheongju is the capital and largest city of North Chungcheong Province in South Korea.

History
Cheongju has been an important provincial town since ancient times. In the Cheongju Mountains, specifically in the one where Sangdang Sanseong is located, ruins dating from the Old Stone Age to the Bronze Age have been found. Settlements associated with the Paleolithic Age have also been discovered at Cheongju such as the Durubong Cave Site. 

After the unification of the kingdoms by Silla in 676, which caused various parts of Korea to adapt Buddhism including Cheongju, because the Silla culture was connected with the Silk Road, which brought the Buddhist religion from Nepal across Northern China to the Korean Peninsula. In the Goryeo era during the reign of Gwangjong, several monuments related to Buddhism were created, among them are Cheol Danggan, built during the year 962 in the center of the city near the remains of Yongdu Temple, which is a flagpole to hang the Dang flag, which is raised to pay tribute to Buddha. Cheol Danggan was listed as a National Treasure in 1962 by the South Korean government. In the Chosen period, the Cheongju region began to adopt Confucianism as its main religion.

Throughout the history of Cheongju, different temples were established during different periods in the history of the Korean peninsula such as the Buddhist Yonghwasa Temple dating back to the Goryeo period in addition to the Bulguksa Temple established in the 8th century during the Silla Dynasty period. Cheongju temples were the first places where advances in Korean printing such as book printing were established, and one of these important documents was printed at Heungdeok Temple during the Goryeo Dynasty, specifically during the year 1377.

One of the first schools established in North Chungcheong Province was founded in Cheongju City during 1896. During the Baekje Dynasty period, several tombs were built around the city, in addition to Joseon Dynasty period forts such as Sangdangsanseong, which served to connect the northern and southern provinces after the Japanese invasion of 1592.

In 1593, the Battle of Cheongju took place between Japanese forces and the Joseon kingdom that then ruled the Korean peninsula during the Hideyoshi's Invasions of Korea, in which more than 8,000 Korean warrior monks participated.

The government of the province relocated here from Chungju in 1908. The opening of the Chungbuk-line in 1926 sparked regional development. In 1946, Cheongju and Cheongwon-gun were separated, and in 1949, Cheongju was upgraded to Cheongju City. Afterwards, it went through the separation of administrative dong and their transfer to Cheongwon-gun, with 2 branch offices (East and West) established in July 1989 that were upgraded to Sangdang-gu and Heungdeok-gu in January.

Cheongju experienced one of the largest population growths in Korea, having almost quadrupled its population from 147,000 in 1970 to 582,158 in 2000.

Geography

Geum River goes through the center of Cheongju city. Additionally, the tributaries of Musim and Miho flow together in the northern part of the city. To the east and west, there are the mountains of Wuam and Bumo. Musimcheon River also goes through the middle of Cheongju city.

Climate
Cheongju is a temperate zone, so there are four seasons. The climate is a humid continental climate (Köppen: Dwa), but can be considered a borderline humid subtropical climate (Köppen: Cwa) using the  isotherm.

Administrative districts
From 1 July 2014, Cheongju and Cheongwon County unified, and administrative districts were changed to the following:
Heungdeok-gu West
Osong-eup, Gangnae-myeon, Oksan-myeon, Uncheon-dong, Sinbong-dong, Bokdae1-dong, Bokdae2-dong, Gakyeong-dong, Bongmyeong1-dong, Bongmyeong2-dong, Songjeong-dong, Gangseo1-dong, Gangseo2-dong, Ochang-eup
Seowon-gu South
Nami-myeon, Hyeondo-myeon, Sajik1-dong, Sajik2-dong, Sachang-dong, Mochooung-dong, Sugok1-dong, Sugok2-dong, Sannam-dong, Bunpyeong-dong, Seonghwa-dong, Geasin-dong, Jookrim-dong
Sangdang-gu East
Nangseong-myeon, Miwon-myeon, Gaduk-myeon, Namil-myeon, Mooni-myeon, Joongang-dong, Seongan-dong, Top-dong, Deasung-dong, Yeongun-dong, Geumcheon-dong, Yongam-dong, Myeongam-dong, Sinsung-dong, Yongam1-dong, Yongam2-dong
Cheongwon-gu North
Nesoo-eup, Buki-myeon, Wooam-dong, Neduk1-dong, Neduk2-dong, Yoolang-dong, Sacheon-dong, Ogeunjang-dong, Ochang-eup

Government and infrastructure
The headquarters of the Ministry of Food and Drug Safety are located in the Osong Health Technology Administration Complex.

Cultural properties
Sangdangsanseong (Sangdang Mountain Fortress) lies on the slopes of Mt. Uam within the city limits. The present walls date to the 1716 restoration of the site. Within the walls lies a small tourist village that has several restaurants.
Cheongju National Museum also lies near Mt. Uam, and houses several exhibits of cultural artifacts from the nearby area.
Heungdeoksa Temple Site is the home to the Early Printing Museum, and is to be the site of the printing of Jikji, the oldest existent book printed using movable metal type.  The museum itself contains exhibits related to the art of printing through the ages.
Yongdusaji Cheoldanggan (The Iron Flagpole of the Yongdu Temple Site) is designated Korean National Treasure number 41, and is located near Lotte Department Store in downtown Cheongju.
National Museum of Modern and Contemporary Art – Cheongju (MMCA Cheongju) which is scheduled to open in December 2018, will be the first museum in Korea to open its conservation center to the general public. Notably, MMCA Cheongju is being constructed within a renovated tobacco factory, which once played a major role in Korea's modern industry. The new building has been especially designed to use energy more efficiently and thus reduce greenhouse gas emissions. As such, the new museum will be a high-profile example of a project combining elements of urban revitalization and historical preservation.
Chojeonghaenggung (Chojeong Temporary Palace) is a temporary palace where King Sejong stayed for treatment of an eye disease. It is said that King Sejong completed the creation of Hangul here. This place was destroyed during the Joseon Dynasty, and restoration work began in December 2017, and construction was completed in December 2019. It opened in June 2020. Also, Chojeong Mineral Water produced near here is quite famous carbonated water. It is known that King Sejong also tried to treat an eye disease with carbonated water produced in Chojeong. Chojeonghaenggung is located in Naesu-eup, Cheongwon-gu.

Transport
Cheongju International Airport provides scheduled flights within Korea and to China. This station is on the Chungbuk Line.
Cheongju Bus Terminal provides almost all of the bus lines to bus terminals located in other cities. Ticketing time is between 4:00 am and 11:40 pm.
Cheongju Express Bus Terminal provides some bus lines for Seoul (Gangnam, Sangbong, South Seoul, East Seoul, Busan, East Deagu, Gwangju).

Education
Cheongju is the site of several tertiary institutions, including:

Cheongju National University of Education
Cheongju University
Chungbuk National University
Chung Cheong University
Korea Air Force Academy
Korea National University of Education
Seowon University

Festival
The Cheongju International Craft Biennale is usually held in September or October.

There is also the Osong Cosmetic and Beauty Expo.

Twin towns – sister cities

Notable people from Cheongju
 Cho Sung-dal, footballer.
 Choi Eun-sil, basketball player.
 Choi Ji-hyun, short track speed skater.
 Choi Soon-ho, football manager and former professional football player.
 Han Hyo-joo, actress.
 Hwang Eun-bi (known as SinB), singer (Viviz).
 Im Jin-ah (known as Nana), singer, actress and model (After School, Orange Caramel).
 Ji Chang-min (known as Q), singer and dancer (The Boyz).
 Ji Min-hyuk, actor.
 Jun Hyo-seong, singer and actress (Secret).
 Kim Ji-woo (known as Chuu), singer.
 Kim Jung-eun (known as Kim Lip), singer.
 Kim Joo-young (known as Jooyoung), singer-songwriter.
 Kim So-yeon (known as Kassy), singer and rapper.
 C. S. Lee, actor and comedian.
 Lee Jin-wook, actor.
 Lee Na-eun, singer and actress (April).
 Lee Seung-hee, ceramic artist.
 Lee Yi-kyung, actor.
 Moon Bin, singer (Astro).
 Moon Sua, singer (Billlie).
 Na Young-seok, television producer.
 Park Cho-rong, singer-songwriter, actress (Apink).
 Shin Dong-woo (known as CNU), singer-songwriter, rapper and actor (B1A4).
 Yoon Dae-woong (known as Bigman), beatboxer, singer-songwriter and composer
 Bae Ho-young (known as Hoyoung), singer and rapper (VERIVERY).

References

External links

City government home page

 

 
Cities in North Chungcheong Province